Bay Vista is a community located in Bremerton, in Kitsap County, Washington. It borders Navy Yard City.

References

Unincorporated communities in Kitsap County, Washington